M. M. Manasi is a playback singer trained in Hindustani Vocal. She has sung more than 170 songs in Tamil, Telugu, Kannada, Malayalam, Hindi and English. She completed her studies at School of Management D.G. Vaishnav College. Her hits in Tamil – "Stylish Thamizachi" in Aarambam, "Kattikeda" in Kakki Sattai, "Semma Mass" in Massu, "Robo Romeo" in Tamizhuku En Ondrai Azhuthavum, "Sottavaala" in Puli, "Aatakari maman ponnu" in Ilayaraja's 1000th film Tharai Thappattai. She won SIIMA Award for Best Female Playback Singer (Telugu) for ''Rangamma Mangamma'' from 2018 Tollywood periodic-drama film Rangasthalam.

Biography
Manasi was born to Tamil speaking parents in Chennai and grew up in Mumbai. At the age of 2 she started learning music, her first public performances were bhajans sung during Navratri and Ganpati poojas. She has a sister, M. M. Monisha.

Manasi was introduced by Ilaiyaraja to the Kannada music industry for the movie Drishya and by Vidhyasagar in Malayalam for Oru Indian Pranayakadha. She made an entry into Bollywood with "Daddy Mummy" in Bhaag Johnny for music director Devi Sri Prasad. This song has 20 million views on YouTube.

Apart from singing, Manasi has also done voice acting for the leading heroines in the Tamil film industry: Baahubali, Thozha, Dharmadurai, Devi, Kaththi Sandai for Tamanna Bhatia, Maari for Kajal Agarwal, Anjaan for Samantha, Kamalinee Mukherjee in Iraivi, Meaghamann for Hansika Motwani, Darling and Velainu Vandhutta Vellaikaaran for Nikki Galrani, Tamizhuku En Ondrai Azhuthavum for Bindhu Madhavi, Vai Raja Vai for Tapsee, Yaan for Thulasi, Idharkkuthane Aasai Pattai Balakumara for Swathi,  Thirumanam Enum Nikkah for Nazriya and Oh My Kadavule for Ritika Singh.

Manasi has sung in Telugu and has many charting songs to her credit like "Bhelpuri" in Aagadu, "Notanki" in Power, "Private Party" in Sarrainodu, "Gunde Aagi Pothande" in Shivam, "Meenakshi" in Masala, "Om Sarvani" in Legend, "Mara O Mara" in Tadakha, "Lucky Lucky Rai" in Balupu, and "Rangamma Mangamma" in Rangasthalam.

Discography

As playback singer
This is only a partial list; Manasi has sung over 171 songs in Telugu, Kannada, Tamil, Malayalam and Hindi

Dubbing artist

Television title songs

References

1993 births
Tamil playback singers
Telugu playback singers
Kannada playback singers
Living people
Singers from Chennai
Tamil singers
Indian voice actresses
Indian women playback singers
Women Hindustani musicians
21st-century Indian singers
21st-century Indian women singers
Women musicians from Tamil Nadu
Indian women classical singers
South Indian International Movie Awards winners